Fantom is a digital trading card software platform that extends the traditional trading card game on-line. The technology also supports digital trading cards swappable using near field communication protocols, and GSM-based interfaces such as the Bump application. In September 2017, Fantom introduced software solution HyperDash that proposes to solve VR gaming concept and built APEX Tournament game.

References

Trading cards
Entertainment software